Raymond Evans (28 September 1939 – 7 November 1974) was an Australian field hockey player who competed in the 1960 Summer Olympics, in the 1964 Summer Olympics, and in the 1968 Summer Olympics.

References

External links
 

1939 births
1974 deaths
Australian male field hockey players
Olympic field hockey players of Australia
Field hockey players at the 1960 Summer Olympics
Field hockey players at the 1964 Summer Olympics
Field hockey players at the 1968 Summer Olympics
Olympic silver medalists for Australia
Olympic bronze medalists for Australia
Olympic medalists in field hockey
Medalists at the 1968 Summer Olympics
Medalists at the 1964 Summer Olympics